Spadafora (Sicilian: Spatafora) is a comune (municipality) in the Metropolitan City of Messina in the Italian region Sicily, located about  east of Palermo and about  northwest of Messina.  
   
Spadafora borders the following municipalities: Roccavaldina, Rometta, Venetico.

References

External links
 Official website

Cities and towns in Sicily